Herbert Baldwin may refer to:
Herbert Baldwin (politician) (1782–1861), Irish politician, Member of Parliament (MP) 1832–1837
Herbert Baldwin (cricketer) (1893–1969), English first class cricketer